Chengtoushan Town is a town in  Li County, Hunan Province, China. It was reformed on November 23, 2015. Chengtoushan Town is divided into 16 villages and 3 communities under its jurisdiction, the seat of town is Zhoujiapo.

The town is named after the known National Historical and Cultural Site of Chengtoushan. Located on the southwestern corner of the county, Chengtoushan Town is immediately adjacent to the east central margin of Linli County.

References

Li County, Hunan
Towns of Hunan